Mormon Trail Community School District is a rural public school district headquartered in Humeston, Iowa. It operates Mormon Trail Elementary and Mormon Trail Junior/Senior High School.

It covers sections of Clarke, Decatur, Lucas, and Wayne counties. Communities in its service area include Humeston, Derby, Garden Grove, and Le Roy.

History

The district was formed in 1959 as a consolidation of schools in Garden Grove, Humeston, and LeRoy.

The school's mascot is the Saints. Their colors are gold and black.

Schools
Mormon Trail Elementary School, Humeston
Mormon Trail Jr-Sr High School, Garden Grove

Mormon Trail High School

Athletics
The Saints compete in the Bluegrass Conference, including the following sports:

Volleyball 
Football (8-man)
Basketball (boys and girls)
Wrestling (with Central Decatur in the Pride of Iowa Conference)
Track and Field (boys and girls)
Baseball 
Softball

In 1995 students of the Lineville–Clio Community School District played for Mormon Trail teams, including American football and volleyball.

See also
List of school districts in Iowa
List of high schools in Iowa

References

External links
 Mormon Trail Community School District

School districts in Iowa
Education in Clarke County, Iowa
Education in Decatur County, Iowa
Education in Lucas County, Iowa
Education in Wayne County, Iowa
School districts established in 1959
1959 establishments in Iowa